Hanna Persson (born 26 January 1996) is a Swedish footballer who plays as a midfielder for IK Uppsala. She began her professional career with FC Rosengård and also played for Brøndby IF of the Danish Elitedivisionen.

Honours 
Rosengård
Winner
 Damallsvenskan (3): 2013, 2014, 2015
 Svenska Supercupen: 2015

Runner-up
 Svenska Cupen: 2014–15

Brøndby

Winner
 Kvindepokalen: 2017–18

Runner-up
 Elitedivisionen: 2017–18

References

External links 
 
 Profile at Swedish Football Association (SvFF) 

1996 births
Living people
Swedish women's footballers
FC Rosengård players
Damallsvenskan players
Women's association football midfielders
IF Limhamn Bunkeflo players
Brøndby IF (women) players
Expatriate women's footballers in Denmark
Swedish expatriates in Denmark